Blowhard is the debut studio album of DUH, released in 1991 by Boner Records.

Reception 

Ned Raggett of AllMusic wrote an enthusiastic review and awarded Blowhard four out of five stars, saying it "kicks up a rough, aggressively produced stink" and "guitars and bass both show the expected in-your-face, heavily produced crunch from said band, artily aggressive and all the better for it."

Track listing

Personnel
Adapted from the Blowhard liner notes.

DUH
 Tom Flynn – Dobro, banjo, pedal steel guitar, backing vocals, harmonica 
 Gary Held  – sampler, drum programming, percussion
 Bob McDonald  – vocals
 Mike Morasky  – bass guitar, backing vocals

Additional musicians
 Dale Flattum  – bass guitar 

Production and design
 Floyd Holland – production
 Tricia Keightley – illustrations
 The Warlock Pinchers – production
 Harvey Bennett Stafford – illustrations

Release history

References

External links 
 

1991 albums
DUH (band) albums
Boner Records albums